Olulis is a genus of moths of the family Noctuidae first described by Francis Walker in 1863.

Description
Palpi with second joint reaching above vertex of head, and long third joint naked. Antennae ciliated. Thorax and abdomen without tufts. Mid legs of male with a large hair from base of tibia. Forewings long and narrow with acute apex. The outer margin angled at middle. Veins 8 to 10 from before the angle and stalked. Hindwings with stalked veins 3 and 4. Veins 5 from near middle of discocellulars.

Species
 Olulis lactigutta Hampson, 1907
 Olulis puncticinctalis Walker, 1863
 Olulis subrosea Turner, 1908

References

Calpinae
Moth genera